Ishaq Ibn Imran (died c. 903-9) was an Arab physician working in Kairouan, which at the time was the capital of Tunisia. His treatise on melancholy, written c.900, was translated into Latin by Constantine the African in the eleventh century.

References

9th-century births
900s deaths
People from Kairouan
Physicians of the medieval Islamic world
9th-century physicians
9th-century people of Ifriqiya